John Christopher Walkington (3 March 1909 – May 1997) was an English rugby union, and professional rugby league footballer who played in the 1920s, 1930s and 1940s.

Background
Jack Walkington was born in Kirkstall, Leeds, West Riding of Yorkshire, England, he worked as a cabinet maker,  he owned a furniture shop adjacent to the Barley Mow, Bramley, the home ground of rugby league club; Bramley, and he died aged 88 in Leeds, West Yorkshire, England.

Playing career

International honours
Jack Walkington won caps for England (RL) while at Hunslet in 1930 against Other Nationalities, in 1931 against Wales, in 1938 against Wales, and in 1944 against Wales.

Championship final appearances
Jack Walkington played , and scored a drop goal in Hunslet's 8-2 victory over Leeds in the Championship Final during the 1937–38 season at Elland Road, Leeds on Saturday 30 April 1938.

County Cup Final appearances
Jack Walkington played  in the Hunslet FC's 7-13 defeat by Hull Kingston Rovers in the 1929–30 Yorkshire County Cup Final during the 1929–30 season at Headingley Rugby Stadium, Leeds on Saturday 30 November 1929, in front of a crowd of 11,000.

Club career
Jack Walkington made his début for Hunslet against Halifax on Saturday 19 March 1927, he scored 11-goals, and 1-try for 25-points against Featherstone Rovers on Wednesday 29 April 1931, and scored 119-goals in Hunslet's victory in the Yorkshire County League during the 1931–32 season. During Jack Walkington's time at Hunslet, they were losing finalists in three Yorkshire County Cup Finals; the 7-13 defeat by Hull Kingston Rovers in the 1929 Yorkshire County Cup Final during the 1929–30 season at Headingley Rugby Stadium, Leeds on Saturday 30 November 1929, the 2-4 defeat by Huddersfield in the 1931 Yorkshire County Cup Final during the 1931–32 season at Headingley Rugby Stadium, Leeds on Saturday 21 November 1931, and the 3-14 (3-12 at Parkside, Hunslet on Saturday 2 December 1944, and 0-2 at Thrum Hall, Halifax on Saturday 9 December 1944) aggregate defeat by Halifax in the 1944 Yorkshire County Cup Final during the 1944–45 Wartime Emergency League season. Jack Walkington made his début for Batley against Bradford Northern at Odsal Stadium, Bradford on Saturday 6 February 1943, and he played and scored 3-goals in the 12-15 defeat by Wigan at Mount Pleasant, Batley on Saturday 13 February 1943.

Testimonial match
Jack Walkington's Testimonial match at Hunslet took place against Hull Kingston Rovers on Saturday 1 January 1938.

Genealogical information
Jack Walkington's marriage to Ada E. (née Clay) was registered during third ¼ 1931 in Leeds North district. They had children; Barbara Walkington (birth registered during second ¼ 1934 in Leeds North district), John G. Walkington (birth registered during third ¼ 1936 in Leeds North district), Christopher R. Walkington (birth registered during fourth ¼ 1937 in Leeds North district), and Dorothy J. Walkington (birth registered during fourth ¼ 1942 in Leeds district).

References

External links
Photograph of Jack Walkington
(archived by web.archive.org) Records / Stats - - Hunslet Hawks

1909 births
1987 deaths
Batley Bulldogs players
England national rugby league team players
English rugby league coaches
English rugby league players
English rugby union players
Hunslet F.C. (1883) captains
Hunslet F.C. (1883) coaches
Hunslet F.C. (1883) players
Leeds Rhinos players
People from Kirkstall
Place of death missing
Rugby league fullbacks
Rugby league players from Leeds
Rugby union players from Leeds